Gamsfeld (2,027 m) is a mountain in Salzburg, Austria. It is the highest peak of the Salzkammergut Mountains, a sub-range of the Northern Limestone Alps. The mountain is located near the village of Rußbach, which lies 1,200 m below its summit, and is a popular peak for hiking and ski touring. It also provides a great vantage point for the nearby Dachstein Mountains.

References 

Mountains of the Alps
Mountains of Salzburg (state)
Two-thousanders of Austria